Chahar Darreh (also Romanized as Chahār Darreh; also known as Chahār Darreh-ye Bālā) is a village in Saroleh Rural District, Meydavud District, Bagh-e Malek County, Khuzestan Province, Iran. At the 2006 census, its population was 114, in 22 families.

References 

Populated places in Bagh-e Malek County